Luitgarde of Vermandois ( – 9 February 978) was a French noblewoman.  She was a countess of Vermandois by birth and a duchess consort of Normandy by her first marriage, and a countess consort of Blois by her second. She was a daughter of Herbert II of Vermandois, and Adele, daughter of Robert I of France. She first married William I of Normandy in 940. This marriage was childless. As a widow, following his death in 942, she married Theobald I of Blois in 943.

She had four children from her second marriage:
Theobald (d. 962)
Hugh, Archbishop of Bourges (d. 985)
Odo (d. 996), count of Blois
Emma (d. 1003), married William IV of Aquitaine

References

910s births
978 deaths
Year of birth uncertain
Herbertien dynasty
Duchesses of Normandy
Countesses of Chartres
10th-century French women
10th-century Normans
10th-century Norman women
Remarried royal consorts